Sébrazac is a commune in the Aveyron department in the Occitanie region in southern France.

Population

See also
Communes of the Aveyron department

References

Communes of Aveyron
Aveyron communes articles needing translation from French Wikipedia